The Reverend Thomas Price (2 October 1787 – 7 November 1848) (known by the bardic name of Carnhuanawc) was a historian and a major Welsh literary figure of the early 19th century. Price was also "an essayist, orator, naturalist, educationalist, linguist, antiquarian, artist and musician". He contributed to learned and popular journals and was a leading figure in the revival of the Eisteddfod.

Biography
Price was born at Pencaerelin, in Llanfihangel Bryn Pabuan, near Builth Wells. In 1805 he attended Brecon Grammar School, now Christ College, Brecon, living in lodgings until he was able to qualify as a deacon of the Church of England. He became a curate in Radnorshire, living at Builth Wells with his mother. He wrote in both the English and Welsh languages. Carnhuanawc was subsequently incumbent of Llanfihangel Cwmdu, Breconshire.

Price was a major influence on Lady Charlotte Guest, whom he assisted in her translation of the Mabinogion. He was also associated with the work of Augusta Hall, Baroness Llanover, to whom he taught Welsh. When his health failed, the baroness became his patron and brought him to live nearby.

Price was an advocate of pan-Celticism and to this end, between 1824 and 1845, he learnt the Breton language. He also encouraged the British and Foreign Bible Society to fund the publication, in 1827, of Jean-François Le Gonidec's translation of the New Testament into Breton. In 1829 he visited Le Gonidec, whom he had assisted with the translation, at his home in Angoulême.

Price was also a close friend of Théodore Hersart de La Villemarqué ("Kervarker"), the leading Breton literary figure of the day, who was editor of the collection of popular songs known as the Barzaz Breiz (Ballads of Brittany). Price brought La Villemarqué to a hugely successful series of Eisteddfodau at Abergavenny.

Works
An Essay on the Physiognomy and Physiology of the Present Inhabitants of Britain (1829)
Hanes Cymru a Chenedl y Cymryo'r Cynoesoedd hyd at Farwolaeth Llywelyn ap Gruffydd ("Welsh History and the Ancient Welsh Nation up to the Death of Llywelyn ap Gruffydd") (1836–1842)
The Geographical Progress of Empire and Civilization (1847)
Literary Remains (1854–55)

References

External links
 Cymdeithas Carnhuanawc (Carnhuanawc Society) – in Welsh, English, French and Breton
 Thomas Price 'Carnhuanawc' (1748–1848) c.1826 by Emmanuel Giaconia, at Founder's Library, Trinity St David, Lampeter

1787 births
1848 deaths
19th-century Welsh historians
Translators of the Bible into Breton
People educated at Brecon Grammar School
19th-century translators